Massimo a masculine Italian given name

Massimo  may also refer to:

 Massimo (surname), an Italian surname
 Massimo family, Roman noble family, notable since the Middle Ages
 Istituto Massimiliano Massimo, Jesuit school in Rome
 San Massimo, municipality in Campobasso, Molise, Italy
 Circo Massimo (Rome Metro), Roman metro station
 Teatro Massimo, opera house in Palermo
 Villa Massimo, German cultural institution in Rome
 Villa Massimo alle Terme Diocleziane

See also

 Palazzo Massimo (disambiguation)
 Maximo (disambiguation)